Bebearia elpinice, the strange forester, is a butterfly in the family Nymphalidae. It is found in eastern Nigeria, Cameroon, Gabon, the Republic of the Congo and the Democratic Republic of the Congo. The habitat consists of forests.

References

Butterflies described in 1869
elpinice
Taxa named by William Chapman Hewitson
Butterflies of Africa